Wolfgang Killing (born 12 February 1953) is a German athlete. He competed in the men's high jump at the 1976 Summer Olympics, representing West Germany.

References

1953 births
Living people
Athletes (track and field) at the 1976 Summer Olympics
German male high jumpers
Olympic athletes of West Germany
People from Oberbergischer Kreis
Sportspeople from Cologne (region)